Bhagwat Pur Village , Taraiya Block , Saran District Panchayat is a village in Saran district near to assembly constituency Taraiya in the Indian state of Bihar  The village has more than 14 Blocks including Noniya tola, Rajpur tola, Yadav Tola. Additionally, it has one of the best names of any village.
Block Name : Taraiya
District : Saran
State : Bihar
Division : Saran

Language : Bhojpuri, Hindi and Urdu

 Assembly constituency : Taraiya assembly constituency
 Assembly MLA : janak singh
 Lok Sabha constituency : Maharajganj parliamentary constituency
 Parliament MP : Janardan Singh 'Sigriwal"
 Serpanch Name : Update/Correct
 Pin Code : 841301
 Post Office Name : Chapra

Bhagwat Pur is a Village in Taraiya Block in Saran District of Bihar State, India. It belongs to Saran Division . It is located 35 KM towards North from District head quarters Chhapra. 6 KM from Taraiya. 85 KM from State capital Patna

Bhagwat Pur Pin code is 841301 and postal head office is Chapra .

Nearest Village/Market
Bhawalpur ( 4 KM ) , Chakahan ( 4 KM ) , Lauwa ( 6 KM ) , Taraiya ( 6 KM ) , Amnour ( 7 KM ) are the nearby Villages to Bhagwat Pur. Bhagwat Pur is surrounded by Isuapur Block towards west , Amnour Block towards South , Marhaurah Block towards South , Panapur Block towards North .

Marhaura , Chhapra , Dighwara , Lalganj are the near by Cities to Bhagwat Pur.

This Place is in the border of the Saran District and Siwan District. Siwan District Bhagwanpur Hat is west towards this place . Also it is in the Border of other district Muzaffarpur .
Demographics of Bhagwat Pur
Bhojpuri is the Local Language here.
Politics in Bhagwat Pur
JD(U) , Bharatiya Janata Party , BJP , RJD , Rashtriya Janata Dal , INC are the major political parties in this area.
Government Schools/Polling Stations /Booths near Bhagwat Pur

1)Madhy Vidhyalay Bhalua Shankardih Bayan Bhag
2)Madhya Vidyalya Sareya Basant Purvi Bhag
3)Madhya Vidyalay Usari Chandpura
4)Madhya Vidyalya Bhagwatpur Dakshin Bhag
5)Utkramit Madhya Vidyalya Bhatgai Hindi Purab Bhag

HOW TO REACH Bhagwat Pur

By Rail
Agauthar Halt Rail Way Station , Terha Halt Rail Way Station are the very nearby railway stations to Bhagwat Pur. Terha Halt Rail Way Station (near to Marhaura) , Chhapra Junction Rail Way Station (near to Chhapra) , Chhapra Kacheri Rail Way Station (near to Chhapra) , Marhaura Rail Way Station (near to Marhaura) are the Rail way stations reachable from near by towns.

By Road
Marhaura , Chhapra are the nearby by towns to Bhagwat Pur having road connectivity to Bhagwat Pur
Colleges near Bhagwat Pur
1.Sridhar Baba Daroga Prasad Ray College Bheldi
Address : Bheldi
2.Kunwara Chandradeep College
Address : Revelganj Chapra
3.Madhaw Singh College Tajpur
Address : Tajpur,bihar
4.Mashrak College Mashrak
Address : Mashrak 841417
5.Sanjay Gandhi Inter College
Address : East Of Nagra Chowk, Patedha Road.
Schools near Bhagwat Pur
Ums Bhatoura Daxin
Address : bhatoura , taraiya , saran , Bihar . PIN- 841424 , Post - Taraiya
Ps Bhagwatpur Gosaitla
Address : bhagawatpur , taraiya , saran , Bihar . PIN- 841418 , Post - Marhowrah
Ps Patti Pachrour
Address : patti pacharour , taraiya , saran , Bihar . PIN- 841424 , Post - Taraiya
U.m.s Gandar
Address : gandar , taraiya , saran , Bihar . PIN- 841417 , Post - Masrakh

Govt Health Centers near Bhagwat Pur
1) Dayalpur , HSC Dayalpur , Dayalpur , Dayalpur
2) Tehti , HSC Tehti , Tehti , tehti
3) Mubarakpur , HSC Mubarakpur , Mubarakpur , Mubarakpur

Bus Stops in Bhagwat Pur,Taraiya
 1.Newari More Bus Stop
Newari; Marhaurah Taraiya Rd; Newari; Bihar 841424; India
1.5 KM distance      Detail
 2.Futani Bazar Bus Stop
SH73; Faridpur; Bihar 841424; India
1.8 KM distance      Detail
 4.Nandanpur Bazar Bus Stop
Nandanpur; Marhaurah Taraiya Rd; Bahora; Bihar 841424; India
2.0 KM distance      Detail
 5.Pachaurar Bazar Bus Stop
SH73; Pachaurar; Bihar 841424; India
2.1 KM distance      Detail

Hindu Temples in Bhagwat Pur,Taraiya
 1.Ram Janki Mandir (Noniya Tola)
Bhagwatpur; Bihar 841418; India
0.4 KM distance      Detail
 2.Maiya Sthan
Newari - Belahari Rd; Newari; Bihar 841424; India
1.5 KM distance      Detail
 4.Newari Mandir
Marhaurah Taraiya Rd; Newari; Bihar 841424; India
1.6 KM distance      Detail
 5.Shiv Mandir
Pachaurar; Bihar 841424; India
1.7 KM distance      Detail
 6. Shree Maa Bhagwati Devi Sthaan
 Newari-Bhagwatpur rd. Bhagwatpur 
 Noniya Tola, 841418

Villages in Saran district